Ross Finch Tucker (born March 2, 1979) is a former American football offensive lineman and current sports broadcaster. Tucker was an All-Ivy League offensive lineman at Princeton University, then played seven seasons in the National Football League (NFL). Tucker retired as a player after suffering a neck injury during the 2007 season. He works for CBS Sports, the Philadelphia Eagles, Westwood One, and Audacy. He also hosts several podcast as part of the Ross Tucker Football Podcast network distributed via DraftKings.

Early years
Tucker attended Wyomissing Area High School, where he earned three varsity letters each in football and basketball. He was All-league at both offensive tackle and defensive end while earning All-county honors at offensive tackle.

As a senior basketball player, he averaged 16.1 points and 9.8 rebounds while making 24 three-pointers. He also received the school's US Army Reserve Scholar-Athlete award.

College career
Tucker attended Princeton University. He was a four-year starter on the Tigers Ivy League football squad.  He started against Colgate University as a freshman at defensive end.

As a sophomore, he moved to right guard. He was named All-Ivy in 2000 and was a two-time Academic All-American selection. In 2019, he was named to the university's 150th Anniversary team.

Professional career
Tucker played in 42 games in his 7-year NFL career, starting 28.

Washington Redskins

Tucker signed with the Washington Redskins as an undrafted free agent after the 2001 NFL Draft. He surprised observers by making the team, even though he suffered a broken hand and a partially torn MCL. The next year, he started 7 games at right guard. He was waived on October 22, 2002.

Dallas Cowboys 

The Dallas Cowboys claimed Tucker off waivers on October 23, 2002. He started at left guard during the last 7 games of the season in place of an injured Larry Allen. On June 5, 2003, he was released after minicamp.

Buffalo Bills 

Tucker was claimed off waivers by the Buffalo Bills on June 16, 2003, and appeared in 12 games, with five starts at right guard. In 2004, he started nine games at left guard and four at center. In 2003, he was named to the USA Today All-Joe team. After missing minicamps because of offseason back surgery and being limited with injuries, he was cut on September 3, 2005.

New England Patriots 

Tucker signed with the New England Patriots on December 13, 2005. He played in one game and was declared inactive in three contests.

Cleveland Browns 
On August 8, 2006, he was traded to the Cleveland Browns in exchange for a conditional 2007 draft choice (not exercised). On August 8, 2006, after LeCharles Bentley tore his patella tendon, Tucker was acquired from the Patriots for a conditional 7th round draft pick. He was released on September 2 after starting the final three preseason games.

Redskins and retirement 

For the second time on March 8, 2007, Tucker signed with the Redskins again as a free agent. He suffered a career-ending neck injury that bruised his spinal cord during the preseason. On August 28, he was placed on the injured reserve list.

He officially announced his retirement in March 2008.

Sports journalism
Tucker joined Sports Illustrated in 2008, writing on the NFL for SIs website. Starting with the beginning of the 2010 NFL season, Tucker became the host of The Morning Kickoff with Ross Tucker on Sirius XM NFL Radio. Tucker has occasionally filled-in for hosting duties on The Dan Patrick Show. Currently, Tucker serves as a commentator for NFL games on Westwood One and is the Philadelphia Eagles preseason game television analyst. He also calls college games on CBS Sports Network. Tucker currently writes an NFL column for The Athletic and is an NFL insider for Audacy. He also hosts many podcasts on his network including the Ross Tucker Football Podcast.

References

External links
Official website

Inc: The NFL's 10 Richest Entrepreneurs — Ross Tucker, 2011

1979 births
Living people
People from Wyomissing, Pennsylvania
People from Berks County, Pennsylvania
Players of American football from Pennsylvania
American football offensive guards
Princeton Tigers football players
Washington Redskins players
Buffalo Bills players
Cleveland Browns players
Dallas Cowboys players
New England Patriots players
College football announcers
National Football League announcers